Forbidden Apple (foaled  May 31, 1995) is an American Thoroughbred racehorse and the winner of the 2001 Manhattan Handicap.

Career

Forbidden Apple's first race was on July 24, 1998 at Belmont Park, where he came in seventh. The colt's first win came on September 13, 1998 in a Maiden Special Weight race at Belmont Park. On the same track he then won an Allowance event on October 25, 1998.

It would not be until September 16, 2000 that Forbidden Apple won his first graded stakes race until he took the mile and one-eighth Belmont Breeder's Cup Handicap. He then picked up another graded win in the one mile Kelso Handicap on October 8, 2000.

Forbidden Apple earned the biggest win of his career when he won the June 9, 2001 Manhattan Handicap at Belmont Park. He then got what turned out to be his last win on October 6, 2001 with a victory in Belmont's Kelso Handicap for the second time. 

On June 8, 2002, Forbidden Apple attempted to defend his Manhattan Handicap title  but finished second to Beat Hollow. He placed multiple times in 2002, coming close in the Bernard Baruch Handicap, Arlington Million, Kelso  Handicap and the Breeders' Cup Mile won by Val Royal.

Forbidden Apple finished his career on January 25, 2003 with a third-place finish in the 2003 Barretts/CTBA Turf Stakes.

Honors
In 2014, the New York Racing Association (NYRA) inaugurated a one mile stakes race on turf at Belmont Park in Forbidden Apple's honor. Open to horses age four and older, the event's first winner was the colt Sayaad, owned by the Shadwell Stable. In 2019 the Forbidden Apple Stakes was given Grade 3 status and transferred to Saratoga Race Course.

Pedigree

References

1995 racehorse births